"When the President Talks to God" is a protest song by Bright Eyes, with a very pointed political message directed towards George W. Bush and his policies. It was originally released as a free download on iTunes but has since been released as a promotional 7" vinyl and as a B-side to "First Day of My Life".

On May 2, 2005, Conor Oberst performed the song on The Tonight Show with Jay Leno.

In June 2006, Oberst expressed that he's "over" the song from having played it too many times.

It won Song of the Year at the 2006 PLUG Independent Music Awards.

Early in the morning on December 19, 2006, the song was offered as a featured free download on the front page of the iTunes Store, but was removed within hours without explanation. The song and the EP are still available for free on iTunes but are not featured on the free download page.

Track listing
"When the President Talks to God" (Conor Oberst) – 2:36

See also
List of anti-war songs

References

2005 singles
Bright Eyes (band) songs
Protest songs
Songs about George W. Bush
Songs critical of religion
2005 songs
Saddle Creek Records singles
Songs written by Conor Oberst